The  was a fleet of the Imperial Japanese Navy, active during the early portions of the Second Sino-Japanese War, and again in World War II, primarily in the Aleutian campaign, during which it was augmented and designated the Northern Area Force.

History

Second Sino-Japanese War
The 5th Fleet was initially formed on 1 February 1938 as part of the Japanese military emergency expansion program in the aftermath of the North China Incident of 1937. The initial plan was to construct 3rd, 4th and 5th China Area Fleets to cover the invasions of Japanese troops into the Chinese mainland, and to interdict and control commerce on the coasts. The 4th and 5th Fleets came under the operational control of the 2nd China Expeditionary Fleet. It participated in the Hainan Island Operation and other maritime interdiction operations off the Chinese coast. The fleet was disbanded on 15 November 1939 when its operations were merged into the China Area Fleet.

World War II
The 5th Fleet was resurrected on 25 July 1941, and tasked with patrols of northern Japanese waters from the northern portion of Honshū, through Hokkaidō, the Chishima Islands, and as far as the Bonin Islands to the east. With the threat of maritime invasion by the Soviet Union considered extremely remote, and with Japanese forces focused on attacking south (Nanshin-ron), the IJN 5th Fleet was considered of secondary importance and was only assigned a couple of light cruisers and smaller vessels.

With the outbreak of World War II, and the Doolittle raid on Tokyo, the 5th Fleet was reinforced by a large number of converted armed merchant vessels. The operational plan for the Battle of Midway called for a diversionary strike north towards the Aleutian Islands. The cruisers of the 5th Fleet – designated the "Northern Area Force" after its augmentation for the operation – covered the landings of Japanese troops on Attu and Kiska on 6–7 June 1942, and were in the Battle of the Komandorski Islands against the United States Navy on 27 March 1943.

However, the IJN 5th Fleet was unable to prevent the recapture of Attu by American forces in May 1943, and – after the abolition of the Northern Area Force on 4–5 August 1943 – from 5 August 1943 to 5 December 1944, the 5th Fleet was reorganized under the operational control of the Northeast Area Fleet, which oversaw the withdrawal of Japanese forces from Kiska and reinforcement of the northern approaches to Japan.

Following Japan's withdrawal from the Aleutians, the Northeast Area Fleet was reassigned directly to the Philippines in October 1944. It participated in the Battle of Leyte Gulf, and surviving vessels were joined to the Southwest Area Fleet on 15 December 1944. On 5 February 1945, the Southwest Area Fleet became the IJN 10th Area Fleet, at which time the remnants of the 5th Fleet's administrative structure were disbanded.

Structure

In Second Sino-Japanese War
Cruiser Division 9
 Heavy cruiser Myōko (Flagship), Light cruiser 
Cruiser Division 10
 Light cruiser Tenryū, Tatsuta
Torpedo Squadron 5
Light cruiser 
Destroyer Division 3
Destroyer Division 16
Destroyer Asagao, Yūgao, Fuyō, Karukaya
Destroyer Division 23
Destroyer Kikuzuki, Mikazuki, Mochizuki,  Yūzuki
Carrier Division 3
Seaplane tender Kamoi, Auxiliary seaplane tender Kagu Maru, Kamikawa Maru
Carrier Division 4
Seaplane tender Notoro, Auxiliary seaplane tender Kinugasa Maru

Order of Battle at time of Pearl Harbor
Cruiser Division 21 (Based at Ōminato)
 Light cruiser  (Flagship), Auxiliary seaplane tender Kimikawa Maru (based at Horomushiro)
Cruiser Division 22 (based at Kushiro)
Auxiliary cruiser Akagi Maru, Asaka Maru, Awata Maru
Gunboat Division 10
Auxiliary gunboat Yoshida Maru, Magane Maru
Subchaser Division 66
Auxiliary subchaser Fumi Maru, No.2 Seki Maru, 
Auxiliary netlayer Kōgi Maru
Minesweeper Division 17
Auxiliary minesweeper No.5 Toshi Maru, No.8 Toshi Maru, Keinan Maru, No.11 Misago Maru
Patrol division 7
Support craft Hokuyō-Gō, Auxiliary support craft No.1 Sasayama Maru
1st Platoon
Auxiliary patrol boat No.5 Fukuichi Maru, Chōkai Maru, No.5 Seiju Maru, Kairyū Maru
2nd Platoon
Auxiliary patrol boat No.3 Yachiyo Maru, No.23 Toku Maru, No.1 Fuku Maru
3rd Platoon
Auxiliary patrol boat Eikichi Maru, No.3 Shōsei Maru, Shōei Maru, No.2 Taihei Maru
4th Platoon
Auxiliary patrol boat No.5 Ebisu Maru, No.2 Kaihō Maru, Kaijin Maru
5th Platoon
Auxiliary patrol boat No.1 Nittō Maru, No.2 Nittō Maru, No.23 Nittō Maru
6th Platoon
Auxiliary patrol boat No.25 Nittō Maru, Kōki Maru, Fuji Maru
No.7 Base Force (based at Chichi-jima)
Chichijima Naval Air Group
Direct control from headquarter of the fleet
Torpedo boat Sagi, Hato
Attached ships for the fleet
Oiler Shiriya
Auxiliary gunboat Kaihō Maru
Auxiliary transport ship Nissan Maru, Chōkō Maru, No.2 Tōkō Maru, Akashisan Maru

Order of Battle at time of Operation Cottage

Cruiser Division 21 (based at Horomushiro)
 Heavy cruiser  (Flagship), Light cruiser , 
Cruiser Division 22
Auxiliary cruiser Akagi Maru, Asaka Maru, Awata Maru
Cruiser Destroyer Squadron 1 (based at Horomushiro)
Light cruiser 
Destroyer Division 2 (This division was detached from CruDesron 4.)
Destroyer 
Destroyer Division 6 (This division was detached from CruDesron 11.)
Destroyer 
Destroyer Division 9
Destroyer , 
Destroyer Division 10 (This division was detached from CruDesron 10.)
Destroyer Division 21 (Shimakaze was detached from CruDesron 2.)
Destroyer Division 31 (This division was detached from CruDesron 2.)
Destroyer 
No.51 Special Base Force (based at Kiska)
Attached ships for the fleet
Submarine Flotilla 7
Submarine I-2, I-4, I-5, I-6
Escort ship Kunashiri
Auxiliary seaplane tender Kimikawa Maru
Auxiliary oiler Nippon Maru, Teiyō Maru

Order of Battle at time of Leyte Gulf
Cruiser Division 16 (They did not participate in the naval battle, because it was commanded to do transportation duty.)
Cruiser Division 21
Heavy cruiser  (Flagship), 
Light cruiser  (She was lent to the 3rd Fleet.)
Light cruiser  (She did not participate in the naval battle, because it was commanded to do transportation duty.)
Cruiser Destroyer Squadron 1
Light cruiser 
Destroyer Division 7
Destroyer ,  
Destroyer Division 18
Destroyer , 
Destroyer Division 21 (It did not participate in the naval battle, because it was commanded to do transportation duty.)

Order of Battle at time of Mindoro
Heavy cruiser  (Flagship)
Cruiser Destroyer Squadron 31
Light cruiser 
Destroyer Division 43
Destroyer Take, Ume, Momo, Sugi, Maki, Kaede
Destroyer Division 52
Destroyer Kashi, Hinoki
Coast Defence Division 21
Escort ship Manju, Kanju, Kasado, Miyake, Ikuna, Yaku
933rd Naval Air Group (Based at Saiki)
Attached ships for fleet
Escort ship No.21, No.22, No.29, No.31, No.43

Commanders of the 5th Fleet

1st Creation

On 15 November 1939 the 5th Fleet was reorganized into the 2nd China Expeditionary Fleet.  Command History continues there.

2nd Creation

Chief of Staff

References

Notes

Books

External links

5
Military units and formations established in 1938
Aleutian Islands campaign
Military units and formations disestablished in 1945
1945 disestablishments in Japan